Levashinsky District (Dargwa: Лавашала къатI) is an administrative and municipal district (raion), one of the forty-one in the Republic of Dagestan, Russia. It is located in the center of the republic. Its administrative center is the rural locality (a selo) of Levashi. As of the 2010 Census, the total population of the district was 70,704, with the population of Levashi accounting for 14.2% of that number.

Administrative and municipal status
Within the framework of administrative divisions, Levashinsky District is one of the forty-one in the Republic of Dagestan. The district is divided into thirteen selsoviets which comprise sixty-seven rural localities. As a municipal division, the district is incorporated as Levashinsky Municipal District. Its thirteen selsoviets are incorporated as twenty-six rural settlements within the municipal district. The selo of Levashi serves as the administrative center of both the administrative and municipal district.

References

Notes

Sources

Districts of Dagestan
